Enchanted is the soundtrack to the 2007 Disney film of the same name. Released on November 20, 2007, by Walt Disney Records, it contains 15 audio tracks, including five original songs used in the film, all of which were written by composer Alan Menken and lyricist Stephen Schwartz. The film's instrumental score, composed by Menken, is also included on the soundtrack. Orchestrated by Kevin Kliesch, Danny Troob, and Blake Neely, the songs and score were conducted by Menken's longtime collaborator Michael Kosarin, and performed by the Hollywood Studio Symphony. Although Menken and Schwartz's "Ever Ever After", performed by country singer-songwriter Carrie Underwood, was not released as a single, a music video of the song was made and is included on the CD.

Track listing
All songs are composed by Alan Menken with lyrics by Stephen Schwartz except track 15 written by Jack Brooks and Harry Warren. All scores composed and produced by Menken. All songs produced by Menken and Schwartz except track 5 produced by Mark Bright and track 15 produced by Blake Neely

Charts

Weekly charts

Year-end charts

Certifications

References

Soundtracks from Enchanted (film)
Disney animation soundtracks
Disney film soundtracks
2007 soundtrack albums
Walt Disney Records soundtracks
Albums produced by Alan Menken
Albums produced by Stephen Schwartz (composer)
Alan Menken soundtracks